Andrew Ananias Harris (July 27, 1896 – October 2, 1957) was an American Negro league infielder and manager between 1917 and 1927.

A native of St. Helena, North Carolina, Harris made his Negro leagues debut in 1917 with the Hilldale Club. He played for the Pennsylvania Red Caps of New York in 1920, and was back with Hilldale in 1922. In 1926, Harris served as player–manager of the Newark Stars in the franchise's lone season in the Eastern Colored League. He finished his playing career with the Lincoln Giants in 1927. Harris died in New York City in 1957 at age 61.

References

External links
 and Baseball-Reference Black Baseball stats and Seamheads
  and Seamheads

1896 births
1957 deaths
Hilldale Club players
Lincoln Giants players
Negro league baseball managers
Newark Stars players
Pennsylvania Red Caps of New York players
20th-century African-American sportspeople
Baseball infielders
Burials at Long Island National Cemetery